Human Switchboard Live was the first album by Human Switchboard.

According to an insert, the album was a very limited fanclub edition recording of 1000 units and was taken from a May '80 Kent Performance & an August '79 performance.

Track listing
All songs written by Bob Pfeifer, except where noted.

Side one
I Can Walk Alone (Bob Pfeifer / Myrna Marcarian)
(I Used To) Believe in You
City
Sharpest Girl
No Heart
I Gotta Know
Book On Looks

Side two

Time, Time, Time
Who's Landing in My Hangar?
Frowntown* (Tony Hatch)
New Song

Personnel
Robert “Bob” Pfeifer  –  vocals, guitar
Myrna Marcarian  – Farfisa organ, vocals
Ron Metz – drums
Dave Schramm – bass*

References 

Human Switchboard Live
Human Switchboard albums
Live new wave albums